Jeffersonville School is a historic school building located at Jeffersonville in Sullivan County, New York.  It was built in 1938-1939 and is a large, expansive, two story Georgian style central school with a below grade basement.  The original building is a "T" shaped, steel frame and concrete structure with red brick and brickwork ornamentation and surmounted by a slate roof. Architect was H.O. Fullerton of Albany, New York. It is topped by a white, windowed cupola, a four sided clock tower, and a weather vane.  It is operated by the Sullivan West Central School as an elementary school.

It was added to the National Register of Historic Places in 1988.

References

School buildings on the National Register of Historic Places in New York (state)
Colonial Revival architecture in New York (state)
School buildings completed in 1939
Schools in Sullivan County, New York
National Register of Historic Places in Sullivan County, New York